Pseudogastromyzon is a genus of gastromyzontid loaches from fast-flowing streams and rivers in China and Vietnam.

Species
There are currently nine recognized species in this genus:
 Pseudogastromyzon changtingensis Y. S. Liang, 1942
 Pseudogastromyzon cheni Y. S. Liang, 1942
 Pseudogastromyzon fangi (Nichols, 1931)
 Pseudogastromyzon fasciatus (Sauvage, 1878)
 Pseudogastromyzon laticeps Yi-Yu Chen & C. Y. Zheng, 1980
 Pseudogastromyzon lianjiangensis C. Y. Zheng, 1981
 Pseudogastromyzon meihuashanensis S. Q. Li, 1998
 Pseudogastromyzon myersi Herre, 1932 (Sucker-belly loach)
 Pseudogastromyzon peristictus C. Y. Zheng & J. P. Li, 1986

References

Gastromyzontidae
Fish of Asia